DOCLE (Doctor Command Language), is a non-numeric health coding and medical classification system. The DOCLE system is used in Health Communication Network's electronic medical record and patient management software package, Medical Director. Medical Director is the most widely used electronic medical record system by Australian primary health care providers.

DOCLE has been modelled on the Linnaean biological classification system since 1995. DOCLE generates clinical codes from ubiquitous health language using an algorithm, hence it is a human readable clinical coding system.

The design principles of DOCLE, as enumerated by the author in the DOCLE website include:
 DOCLE codes being meaningful and intentional
 DOCLE codes are derived from ubiquitous health language
 DOCLE codes grew with evolving order and speciation of large scale structures in a linnean manner.
 DOCLE codes are designed to strap together and form clinical structures using joiner codes
 The author of DOCLE, Dr. Y Kuang Oon, has likened clinical codes to "neurons" and joiner codes as the "glia"

See also 
 Electronic medical record
 ICD – International Classification of Diseases
 International Classification of Primary Care
 LOINC – Logical Observation Identifiers Names and Codes
 Medical classification
 Medical record
 SNOMED CT – Systematized Nomenclature of Medicine – Clinical Terms

References

External links 
Docle Systems Web Site

Medical classification